John Peter Featherston (November 28, 1830 – 1917) was the mayor of Ottawa, Ontario, Canada, from 1874 to 1875.

Born in Durham, England, in 1830, he came to Canada in 1858. Upon settling in Ottawa, he opened a drug store. In 1867 he was elected to city council, and in 1879 was appointed clerk and registrar for the Carleton County court. He served as chairman of the board for the Ottawa Collegiate Institute, and ran unsuccessfully to represent the City of Ottawa in the federal parliament in an 1877 by-election. Featherston was a District Deputy Grand Master of the Freemasons.

Very little is known about Featherston, other than that he was a Liberal politician, and that he wired Richard Scott (later Sir Richard William Scott, K.C., P.C.) in 1871 advising him to enter the Liberal government. Later that year Scott became speaker of the legislature.

Family

In 1871 John Peter Featherston married Bessie Parnell, daughter of John Parnell, of County Wicklow, Ireland. She was born in Dublin, and accompanied her parents to Canada. She volunteered with the Carleton Protestant Hospital, the Maternity Hospital, the Lady Stanley Institute, and the Ottawa Humane Society. She served as president of the Ladies' Auxiliary for the Carleton Protestant Hospital. Her residence as Lady Mayoress was 452 Rideau Street, Ottawa.

References

External links 
 
 Mayors of major Canadian cities
 Sir Richard Scott, K. C.
 Why not O’Donoghue Street?

1830 births
1917 deaths
Mayors of Ottawa
English emigrants to pre-Confederation Ontario
People from Durham, England
Immigrants to the Province of Canada
Lisgar Collegiate Institute alumni